The following is an incomplete list of office-supply companies in the United States.

0–9
 3M

A–M 

 A.B. Dick Company
 A. T. Cross Company 
 ACCO Brands 
 Alliance Rubber Company 
 Avery Dennison 
 Blackfeet Indian Writing Company
 Bostitch 
 Esterbrook
 Eversharp 
 J. K. Gill Company
 InkStop
 Kardex Group

N–Z

 Office 1 Superstore 
 Office Depot 
 OfficeMax
 Office Zone
 Pendaflex 
 Paper Mate 
 Parker Pen Company 
 Pitney Bowes 
 Quill Corporation 
 ReStockIt
 Sawyer's 
 Sheaffer
 Shoplet
 Standard Adding Machine Company
 Staples Inc. 
 Swingline 
 Victor Technology
 Waterman pens 
 W.B. Mason 
 Westcott scissors and rulers 
 Western Tablet and Stationery Company, Building No. 2

See also

 List of stationery topics

References

Office supply